Downtown Detroit is the central business district and a residential area of the city of Detroit, Michigan, United States. Locally, downtown tends to refer to the 1.4 square mile region bordered by M-10 (Lodge Freeway) to the west, Interstate 75 (I-75, Fisher Freeway) to the north, I-375 (Chrysler Freeway) to the east, and the Detroit River to the south. Although, it may also refer to the Greater Downtown area, a 7.2 square mile region that includes surrounding neighborhoods such as Midtown, Corktown, Rivertown, and Woodbridge.

The city's main thoroughfare M-1 (Woodward Avenue) links Downtown to Midtown, New Center, and the North End.

Downtown contains much historic architecture, including prominent skyscrapers, ranging from the Renaissance Center, the Penobscot Building, One Detroit Center, and the Guardian Building. Historic churches, theatres, and commercial buildings anchor the various downtown districts. Downtown has a number of parks including those linked by a promenade along the International Riverfront. Its central square is Campus Martius Park.

History

Following the Detroit fire of 1805, the design for the downtown area was left open to a new vision. Augustus B. Woodward proposed a radial design for the post-fire city, where major streets such as Woodward, Washington, and Madison Avenue would spiral off Grand Circus Park. The downtown streets still loosely follow Woodward's original design. Business in Detroit boomed along with its growing automobile industry, leading to an increase in downtown's population and wealth. Much of the downtown area's architecture was built during this boom, in the late 19th century and early 20th century, and still attracts the attention of architects. Several buildings were built by the famous Minoru Yamasaki (most well known for designing the twin towers in New York City), including the McGregor Memorial Conference Center and Federal Reserve Bank of Chicago Detroit Branch Building.

The area where I-375 is lies on the historic site of Black Bottom and Paradise Valley. Black Bottom was one of the city's major African American communities, historically named by French colonial settlers for its rich soil. Paradise Valley was the business and entertainment district of Black Bottom, best known for its Paradise Theatre and Hotel Gotham, where prominent jazz figures such as Duke Ellington, Billie Holiday, and Louis Armstrong performed and stayed respectively. Both neighborhoods were demolished to build I-375, and have since been replaced with Lafayette Park.

Revitalization

Downtown was once notorious for its abandonment, vacant buildings, and disinvestment. However, in recent years, the downtown area has seen tremendous growth and redevelopment.

Since 2000 a number of major construction projects have been completed including the new Compuware Headquarters at Campus Martius Park and two new stadiums: Comerica Park and Ford Field. General Motors moved their headquarters into the Renaissance Center, and the Detroit Lions have relocated from Pontiac to Downtown Detroit. High-profile events like the 2005 MLB All-Star Game, Super Bowl XL, and the 2006 and 2012 World Series have taken place in downtown, generating income for local businesses and spurring more growth. As a result, new residents are moving into Detroit in the assortment of new lofts that are opening. An example of these trends is the Westin Book-Cadillac Hotel. In 2006, the Cleveland-based Ferchill Group began the $180 million redevelopment of the historic Book Cadlliac Hotel at the corner of Washington Blvd. and Michigan Avenue. The project, which has been hailed by preservationists houses a 455-room Westin Hotel, 67 high-end condominiums, and two to three restaurants, and some miscellaneous retail serving hotel and conference center guests. DTE Energy Headquarters features an urban oasis of parks, walkways, and a reflecting pool.

In 2007, Downtown Detroit was named among the best big city neighborhoods in which to retire by CNN Money Magazine editors. Downtown contains popular destinations including, the International Riverfront, the MGM Grand Detroit, Greektown Casino Hotel, and many sites listed on the National Register of Historic Places.

Downtown Detroit hosts over 92,000 workers which make up about one-fifth of the city's total employment base; in addition, it is home to about 6,200 residents. Downtown offers a number of residential high rises, including Riverfront Towers, The Albert, and Town Residences.

The Renaissance Center contains the Detroit Marriott hotel, General Motors headquarters, as well as many shops and restaurants. Compuware has its headquarters in the Compuware World Headquarters building by Campus Martius Park in Downtown Detroit. Compuware moved its headquarters and 4,000 employees to Downtown Detroit in 2003. Little Caesars and Olympia Entertainment have their headquarters in the Fox Theatre. Ernst & Young has offices in One Kennedy Square on Campus Martius Park. Pricewaterhouse Coopers has offices in a building across from Ford Field. Chrysler maintains executive offices at Chrysler House in the city's Financial District. In 2011, Quicken Loans moved its headquarters and 4,000 employees to downtown. Comerica Bank and Blue Cross Blue Shield of Michigan are also major employers downtown.

Throughout the late 2010s, a large amount of business and investment have continued to enter the city and transform it. As of 2019, businesses such as Shinola, Google, Moosejaw, and Nike occupy the once-vacant street fronts. Investments such as new bike lanes, the Little Caesars Arena and QLine have been successful in attracting newcomers to the city. Downtown's transformation in recent years has also perpetuated the discussion of gentrification within the city. The downtown area is notably wealthier than other parts of the city, and has attracted a new demographic of white, middle class tourists and residents, physically and culturally displacing the black residents of the inner city. The ever-increasing lack of affordable housing and venues for locals have further contributed to this displacement. It is an ongoing debate whether or not this redevelopment is good for the downtown area and Detroit as a whole.

In 2021, the 2-acre Hudson's site 680-foot tower, and the 232-foot tall, block-long building called “the block”, with the two sections being separated by an activated alley, were under construction by Dan Gilbert's real estate firm, Bedrock Detroit, that will include 150 apartments, a 200-plus-room hotel, office, retail and event space. Further ongoing new construction underway were, The Exchange, a 16-story residential tower, and the 20-story Huntington Bank headquarters tower. And in late 2021, Stephen Ross and Christopher Ilitch, announced plans for the new home of the UofM’s, Detroit Center for Innovation (DCI), a $250 million, 4-acre, three building graduate school campus, in the downtown District Detroit area.

Districts

Demographics

As of the 2020 Census, there were 6,151 people living in the district. The population density was 4,271.5 people per square mile (1,649.2/km2). There were 5,323 housing units. The census reported the district residents as 54.2% White, 30.4% Black, 0.4% Native American, 6.4% Asian, 0.09% Pacific Islander, 2.2% other races, and 6.0% two or more races. Hispanic or Latino of any race were 6.5% of the total population.

As recently as 2011 the population of full-time residents in Downtown Detroit was relatively low. However, its population grew by an estimated 15 percent between 2012 and 2016 as it experienced a construction boom.

Government

The city of Detroit offices are located in the Coleman Young Municipal Building. The Guardian Building serves as headquarters for Wayne County. Detroit Fire Department has its headquarters in Downtown Detroit. The Detroit Police Department has its headquarters in Downtown Detroit. The Central District patrol division of the police department serves Downtown Detroit.

Federal offices are in the Patrick V. McNamara Federal Building. They include an FBI field office.

Infrastructure

The Detroit Greyhound Lines station is directly west of Downtown along the John C. Lodge Freeway. The Detroit Department of Transportation system provides mass-transit by bus. The Rosa Parks Transit Center, completed in 2009, serves as the main hub for the bus systems downtown. It is adjacent to two stops on the Detroit People Mover. The People Mover, a 2.94-mile (4.7 km) automated rail rapid transit system, operates on a single-track, one-way loop through the downtown area. Suburban Mobility Authority for Regional Transportation has its headquarters in the Buhl Building in Downtown Detroit.

In late July 2014, construction began on the M-1 Rail Line, which opened to the public in 2017. It runs 3.3 miles on Woodward Avenue from Congress Street in Downtown Detroit to the Grand Boulevard station in New Center.

Economy
Companies with headquarters in Downtown Detroit include Compuware, Dickinson Wright, General Motors, Little Caesars, Campbell-Ewald, Miller Canfield, and Quicken Loans.

October 28, 2014, Fifth Third Bank announced plans to move its Michigan regional headquarters from Southfield to downtown Detroit in what will be named the Fifth Third Bank Building at One Woodward. The office had 150 employees.

Previously Comerica Bank had its headquarters in Downtown Detroit. On March 6, 2007, the company announced its decision to relocate its corporate headquarters to Dallas. The company executives began moving to Dallas in November 2007. At one time Real Times Media, the owner of black newspapers in the United States, had its headquarters in the Globe Tobacco Building, and later the Buhl Building.

Media

The Detroit Media Partnership, housing both The Detroit News and the Detroit Free Press, has its headquarters in Downtown Detroit.

The Metro Times was previously headquartered in the Detroit Cornice and Slate Company Building in Downtown.

The studio of WDIV (Detroit's NBC affiliate) is located in Downtown Detroit; it is the only TV station in the Detroit media market with studios located in the city as WXYZ, WJBK, WWJ, WMYD, WPXD, and WKBD (affiliates of ABC, Fox, CBS, MyNetworkTV, Ion Television and The CW respectively) have their studios in the nearby city of Southfield.

Park and entertainment
Downtown Detroit has seen a major growth in entertainment  in the past decade. Campus Martius Park is open year-round, with ice skating in the winter with a huge Christmas tree display, to a large fountain and many concerts in the summer. Downtown Detroit has also seen major growth in retail, such as Michigan-based Moosejaw outdoor clothing. In December 2012, the largest Buffalo Wild Wings in the country opened in the district, and a new mixed-use development by CEO Dan Gilbert, businessman, and developer, The Z, due to its Z-like shape, with 1,300 parking spaces, artwork, LED lighting, and 33,000-square-feet of street level retail space. The Z is full of murals and other artwork from 27 international artists, and the floors are color-coded.  The Z opened on January 30, 2014. On December 10, 2014, Punch Bowl Social opened a new 24,000-square-foot bi-level eatery and entertainment complex in The Z structure.

Some places for entertainment and attractions within the downtown region include Campus Martius Park, Philip A. Hart Plaza, Coleman A. Young Community Center, Detroit Riverwalk, Fox Theatre, Ford Field, Little Caesars Arena, and Comerica Park.

Education

Colleges and universities
The University of Detroit Mercy School of Law is located downtown across from the Renaissance Center. Wayne County Community College District (WCCCD) has its headquarters in Downtown Detroit. The Downtown Campus of the district is located adjacent to Downtown Detroit and adjacent to the WCCCD headquarters. Wayne State University is located in Midtown Detroit. The Corktown Campus, near downtown at 2700 Martin Luther King Jr. Boulevard, houses the University of Detroit Mercy School of Dentistry and Dental Clinic. The main campus of the  University of Detroit Mercy is located uptown.

The Detroit College of Law was in Downtown Detroit until 1997. It moved to East Lansing, Michigan in 1997 and is now known as the Michigan State University College of Law.

Primary and secondary education
 there is a concentration of charter schools and senior high schools in the Downtown Detroit area - there were eleven high schools and 1,894 high school-aged students in the area- relative to other parts of Detroit which had more high school students but fewer schools available. This is because Downtown Detroit is relatively wealthy compared to other parts of Detroit and because of gentrification.

The Detroit Public Schools, charter schools, and private schools serve city residents. Downtown residents enrolled in the public school system are zoned for Martin Luther King High School. Some downtown residents are zoned for Burton K-8 for elementary school, while others are zoned to Chrysler Elementary School. Burton K-8 and Bunche K-8 serve portions of Downtown for Middle School.

Previously Dewey K-8 served portions of Downtown Detroit for elementary school. Previously Miller Middle School, and Duffield Middle School served portions of Downtown Detroit. Previously Murray-Wright High School served Downtown Detroit for high school.

The Archdiocese of Detroit lists a number of primary and secondary schools in the city, along with those in the metro area. There are 23 Catholic high schools in the Archdiocese of Detroit. Of the three Catholic high schools in the city, two are operated by the Society of Jesus and the third is co-sponsored by the Sisters, Servants of the Immaculate Heart of Mary and the Congregation of St. Basil.

Public libraries
The Detroit Public Library operates the Rose and Robert Skillman Branch Library downtown at 121 Gratiot with the library headquarters located in Midtown. The downtown branch first opened January 4, 1932. Skillman received its current name after the Skillman Foundation donated to the library system.

Diplomatic missions
Two consulates are located in the Renaissance Center; the Consulate-General of Japan, Detroit is located on the 16th Floor of the 400 Tower, and the Consulate-General of Canada in Detroit is located in Suite 1100 of the 600 Tower. The Consulate of Italy in Detroit is located in Suite 1840 in the Buhl Building. The Consulate of Mexico in Detroit is located in Suite 830 in the Penobscot Building.

See also

 Midtown
 New Center
 Corktown
 North Corktown

Notes

References

Further reading
 Metzger, Kurt and Jason C. Booza. "Reality vs. Perceptions An Analysis of Crime and Safety in Downtown Detroit" (Archive). Created for the Detroit Metro Convention & Visitors Bureau by Wayne State University and the Michigan Metropolitan Information Center. June 14, 2005.

External links

Downtown Detroit Partnership

 
D
Detroit
Culture of Detroit
Detroit River
Michigan populated places on the Detroit River